Mary Berry is a British food writer, best known for her work with AGA cooking and for baking. The Hamlyn All Colour Cookbook was her first published cook book, in which she collaborated with Ann Body and Audrey Ellis. She has since gone on to write over seventy cook books, which have sold over five million copies.

Books

References

Bibliographies by writer
Bibliographies of British writers
British cookbooks
Cookbooks